Shimun, also transliterated as Shemʿon or Shimon is the form of Simon used in Classical Syriac and other Aramaic languages.

Mar Shimun may refer to any of the following Patriarchs of the Church of the East or Patriarchs of the Chaldean Catholic Patriarchs of Babylon:

Shemʿon bar Sabbaʿe, (329-341), Catholicos-Patriarch of the Church of the East
 Shemʿon II (1365–1392), Patriarch of the Church of the East
 Shemʿon III (1403–1407), Patriarch of the Church of the East
 Shemʿon IV (1437–1497), Patriarch of the Church of the East
 Shemʿon V (1497–1501), Patriarch of the Church of the East
 Shemʿon VI (1503–1538), Patriarch of the Church of the East
 Shemʿon VII (1538–1551), Patriarch of the Church of the East
Shemʿon VII Ishoʿyahb, (1539–1558) Patriarch of the Church of the East
 Shemʿon VIII (1553–1555), Patriarch of the Chaldean Catholic Church
 Shimun IX (1558)
 Shimun IX Dinkha (1580–1600), Patriarch of the Chaldean Catholic Church
 Shimun X Eliyah (1600–1638), Patriarch of the Chaldean Catholic Church
 Shimun XI Eshuyow (1638–1656), Patriarch of the Chaldean Catholic Church
 Shimun XII Yoalaha (1656–1662), Patriarch of the Chaldean Catholic Church
 Shimun XIII Dinkha (1662–1692), Patriarch of the Chaldean Catholic Church and after breaking the Communion with Rome in 1692, Patriarch of the Assyrian Church of the East until 1700
 Shimun XIV Shlemon (1700–1740), Patriarch of the Assyrian Church of the East
 Shimun XV Maqdassi Mikhail (1740–1780), Patriarch of the Assyrian Church of the East
 Shimun XVI Yohannan (1780–1820), Patriarch of the Assyrian Church of the East
 Shimun XVII Abraham (1820–1860), Patriarch of the Assyrian Church of the East
 Shimun XVIII Rubil (1860–1903), Patriarch of the Assyrian Church of the East
 Shimun XIX Benyamin (1903–1918), Patriarch of the Assyrian Church of the East
 Shimun XX Paulos (1918–1920), Patriarch of the Assyrian Church of the East
 Shimun XXI Eshai (1920–1975) (assassinated), Patriarch of the Assyrian Church of the East

See also
 List of patriarchs of the Church of the East
 List of Chaldean Catholic patriarchs of Babylon

References